Joel David Moore (born September 25, 1977) is an American character actor and director. Born and raised in Portland, Oregon, Moore studied acting in college before relocating to Los Angeles to pursue a film career. His first major role was as Owen Dittman in the 2004 comedy Dodgeball: A True Underdog Story, followed by roles in the comedy Grandma's Boy (2006), Terry Zwigoff's Art School Confidential (2006), and the independent slasher film Hatchet (2006).

In 2008, he was cast in the role of Colin Fisher on the Fox series Bones, a guest role he portrayed in sixteen episodes until the series' conclusion in 2017. In 2009, he was cast as Dr. Norm Spellman in James Cameron's Avatar (2009), a role he reprised for the film's sequels, Avatar: The Way of Water (2022) and the upcoming Avatar 3 (2024).

Moore has also starred in several music videos, and directed films: His directorial debut was the psychological thriller Spiral (2007), followed by the drama  Youth in Oregon (2016), and the yet-to-be-released Killing Winston Jones.

Early life 
Moore was born September 25, 1977 in Portland, Oregon, the son of Missy (née Irvine) and John Moore. Moore was raised in Portland, where his family resided in the Mount Tabor neighborhood. He graduated from Benson Polytechnic High School in 1995.

After high school, Moore attended Mt. Hood Community College in Gresham, Oregon, for two years. In 1998, he transferred to Southern Oregon University in Ashland, Oregon, where he earned his Bachelor of Fine Arts degree in 2001 and performed for two summers at the Oregon Shakespeare Festival.

Career

2000–2007: Early roles
Before relocating to Hollywood, Joel starred with Gretchen Stouts and Nina Smidt in Tom Monson's Drug Wars, The High Times (1999), a video about underage binge drinking.

In 2000, he moved to Los Angeles, California, and appeared in several television commercials, including ones for eBay, Cingular Wireless, and Best Buy.  Moore shot an international campaign for a branch of Siemens cell phones, XELIBRI, which won a Lion Award. Moore made an appearance in the music video for the song "Youth of the Nation" by rap rock band P.O.D.

Moore's first major film role was in 2004's Dodgeball: A True Underdog Story. Between 2004 and 2005, he appeared in a recurring guest role on the NBC series LAX. This was followed by roles in the films Grandma's Boy, and as a jaded art student in Terry Zwigoff's Art School Confidential (both 2006). The same year, he also had a lead role in the independent slasher film Hatchet, a bit part in The Shaggy Dog, and a supporting role in El Muerto, based on the eponymous comic book series. Also in 2007, Moore made directorial debut with the psychological thriller Spiral, which he filmed in his hometown of Portland, and co-starred in with Amber Tamblyn.

2008–present: Acting and directing
In 2008, he was cast in the supporting role of Dr. Norm Spellman in James Cameron's Avatar (2009). The same year, he was cast as intern Colin Fisher on the Fox series Bones, a guest role he would portray across sixteen episodes until the series' conclusion in 2017. During the fifth season episode "The Gamer in the Grease", his character invites the other interns to attend the Avatar premiere. Moore also had a supporting role in Beyond a Reasonable Doubt (2009), a remake of the 1956 film of the same name. He also starred alongside Katy Perry in her 2009 music video for "Waking Up in Vegas".

Other film roles included a supporting part in 2012's Savages, directed by Oliver Stone, and in the crime-thriller Gone (2012), opposite Amanda Seyfried. Moore directed Killing Winston Jones in fall 2012 in Savannah, Georgia, which starred Danny Glover, Jon Heder and Richard Dreyfuss.

He would also reprise his role with a cameo appearance in Hatchet III (2013). during 2014–2015, he had a supporting role in the series Forever, and also in the thriller The Guest (2014), and Joey Ramone in the 2013 historical film CBGB.

In 2016, he directed his second feature, Youth in Oregon, starring Frank Langella, Christina Applegate and Billy Crudup. In 2017, it was reported that Moore had signed on to appear in the Avatar sequels, Avatar: The Way of Water (2022) and Avatar 3 (2024).

Filmography

Film

Television

Music videos

References

External links 

 
 
 

1977 births
American male film actors
American male television actors
Living people
Male actors from Portland, Oregon
Southern Oregon University alumni
Benson Polytechnic High School alumni
Mt. Hood Community College alumni
20th-century American male actors
21st-century American male actors